Merulius berkeleyi is a species of fungi in the family Meruliaceae. It is from Sri Lanka.

References 

Meruliaceae
Fungi described in 1891
Fungi of Sri Lanka